The 2011 European Track Championships was the second edition of the elite European Track Championships in track cycling and took place at the Omnisport Arena in Apeldoorn, Netherlands, between 21 and 23 October.

All ten Olympic events, (sprint, team sprint, keirin, team pursuit and omnium all for both men and women) and the non-Olympic men's madison championship and points races for both genders were held as part of the championships. The Championships were a qualification event for the 2012 Olympic Games.

The opening night of competition was marred by technical difficulties, specifically the mechanical breakdown of the fixed gates system. as a result of which all releases reverted to hand or manual releases. This mechanical difficulty caused two German false starts in the Women's Team Pursuit final, and may have played some part in the shock failure of Great Britain to make the medal finals in the Men's Team Sprint event.

Despite this latter mishap, and the early withdrawal of Sir Chris Hoy with illness, the event was dominated by Great Britain, winning seven golds from the ten Olympic events, despite failing to medal in either individual sprint event.

Events

 q = rode in qualification round only.
 w = won on countback
 shaded events are non-Olympic

Medal table

Participating nations
23 nations participated.

, ''see: Netherlands at the 2011 European Track Championships

References

External links

European Cycling Union
Results
Results book

European Track Championships
European Track Championships
 
European Track Championships
International cycle races hosted by the Netherlands
Cycling in Apeldoorn